Älpelekopf is a 2,024 m (6,640 ft) tall mountain in the Allgäu Alps of Bavaria, Germany.

References

Mountains of Bavaria
Allgäu Alps
Mountains of the Alps